The Mercator School of Management  (MSM) refers to the faculty of business administration of the University of Duisburg-Essen in North Rhine-Westphalia, Germany.

The Mercator School of Management is a classic business school located in Duisburg. It involves twenty-eight chairs, sixteen of them in different business administration and management disciplines, twelve of them in economics and other fields. The Chair of Internal Auditing is unique in Germany: "In December 2016, he [Univ.-Prof. Dr. Marc Eulerich] received a full professorship at the Chair of Internal Auditing, which is the only university chair in Germany with an explicit focus on Internal Auditing in both research and teaching."
Each of the three pillars of the MSM combines four of those chairs in a research department.

Academic programs 
 Bachelor of Science
 Business Administration
 Business Education
 * Master of Science
 (International) Business Administration
 Accounting and Finance
 Management and Marketing
 Logistikmanagement (terminating)
 Business Analytics
 Supply Chain Management and Logistics
 Telecommunications Management
 Innopreneurship

Research departments 
The central research areas are "Accounting and Finance", "Technology and Operations Management", and "Management and Marketing", each of which is also responsible for a specialized master program of the same name.

In addition, the mainly service-oriented chairs have been combined in the Department of Managerial Economics, which presents the educating foundation of the Mercator School of Management. Next to the three chairs of Economics, it includes chairs of East Asia Studies covering the areas of Japan/Korea and China, a chair of Business Education and Didactics and the fields of Management Science and Business Law.

The european center for financial services (ecfs) is a research institute within the Mercator School of Management to connect research with practical knowledge in financial services.

The programs offered by the Mercator School of Management are conform to ECTS (European Credit Transfer System) guidelines to guarantee that credits earned abroad or at the MSM can easily be taken into account. The accredited Bachelor of Science in Business Administration offers A-level/Abitur graduates a first professional degree with a broad theoretical foundation.

After having earned an honor’s degree in the  Bachelor of Science in Business Administration (or a comparable program), students can choose from seven alternative Master programs of four semesters each. The internationalized General Management Track allows students to specialize in one field from each of the three business administration departments mentioned above.

Study abroad programs 
The Mercator School of Management obliges students to spend a semester abroad. Some selected partner universities:
 Georgia Institute of Technology
 Copenhagen Business School
 Hong Kong Baptist University
 Paris-Sorbonne University
 University of Illinois at Urbana–Champaign
 Sophia University
 American University
 Warsaw School of Economics
 Hogeschool van Arnhem en Nijmegen
 Lehigh University

The MSM offers also a double-degree program, where students then be eligible to receive additional degrees like the MBA in cooperation with several American Universities.

Rankings 
The MSM is ranked by the Centrum für Hochschulentwicklung second in 2011 in the area "International Publications" as well as "Citation". The business newspaper Handelsblatt
ranked the Mercator School of Management 17th for business schools in Germany, Austria and Switzerland.

Notable people 
 Heinz Hilgert, former CEO WestLB AG
 Hannelore Kraft, Minister-President of North Rhine-Westphalia

References

External links
 Mercator School of Management Website 
 Mercator School of Management Website 

University of Duisburg-Essen
Business schools in Germany
Educational institutions established in 2005
2005 establishments in Germany